Albay's at-large congressional district may refer to three occasions when a provincewide at-large district was used for elections to the various Philippine national legislatures from Albay.

From 1898 to 1901, five representatives from the province who were elected at-large sat in the Malolos Congress, the National Assembly of the First Philippine Republic. Albay was reorganized under the Insular Government of the Philippine Islands in 1901 with Catanduanes annexed to it and was divided into three districts for the Philippine Assembly in 1907. From 1943 to 1944, the province as a whole sent two representatives to the National Assembly of the Second Philippine Republic. Multiple district representation was restored in the province in 1945. In 1978, regional at-large assembly districts were created for the national parliament with Albay included in the 12-seat Region V's at-large district. The province returned to its own single multi-member at-large district in 1984 with a three-seat delegation for the Regular Batasang Pambansa of the Fourth Philippine Republic.

After 1986, Albay elected its representatives from its congressional districts.

Representation history

See also
Legislative districts of Albay

References

Former congressional districts of the Philippines
Politics of Albay
1898 establishments in the Philippines
1901 disestablishments in the Philippines
1943 establishments in the Philippines
1944 disestablishments in the Philippines
1984 establishments in the Philippines
1986 disestablishments in the Philippines
At-large congressional districts of the Philippines
Congressional districts of the Bicol Region
Constituencies established in 1898
Constituencies disestablished in 1901
Constituencies established in 1943
Constituencies established in 1984
Constituencies disestablished in 1986
Constituencies disestablished in 1944